The play-offs of the 2015 Fed Cup Asia/Oceania Zone Group II were the final stages of the Group II Zonal Competition involving teams from Asia and Oceania. Using the positions determined in their pools, the eleven teams faced off to determine their placing in the 2015 Fed Cup Asia/Oceania Zone Group II. The top team advanced to Asia/Oceania Group I in 2016.

Pool results

1st to 4th play-offs 
The first placed teams of the pools were drawn in head-to-head rounds.

Philippines vs. Indonesia

Turkmenistan vs. India

Promotion play-off 
The winners of the 1st to 4th play-offs then played against each other for promotion. The winner advances to the Asia/Oceania Group I in 2016.

Philippines vs. India

5th to 8th play-offs
The second placed teams of the pools were drawn in head-to-head rounds to find the fifth to eighth placed teams.

Singapore vs. Pacific Oceania

Iran vs. Malaysia

9th to 10th play-offs 
The third placed teams of Pools B and C were drawn in a head-to-head round to find the 9th and 10th placed teams. The third-place team from Pool D finished in 11th place.

Kyrgyzstan vs. Pakistan

Final placements 

  advanced to Asia/Oceania Zone Group I in 2016.

See also 
 Fed Cup structure

References

External links 
 Fed Cup website

P2